Nástup is a 1953 Czechoslovak drama film directed by Otakar Vávra.

Cast
 Ladislav Chudík as Bagar
 Jaroslav Mareš as Antos
 Karel Höger as Trnec
 Jaroslav Průcha as Dejmek
 Vlasta Fabianová as Dejmkova

References

External links
 

1953 films
1953 drama films
1950s Czech-language films
Films directed by Otakar Vávra
Czechoslovak drama films
1950s Czech films